The Consumer Credit Act 2006 (c.14) is an Act of the Parliament of the United Kingdom intended to increase consumer protection when borrowing money.

Provisions

The main provisions of the Act are to extend the scope of the Consumer Credit Act 1974, to create an Ombudsman scheme, and to increase the powers of the Office of Fair Trading in relation to consumer credit, including consumer credit agreements (CCA), and similar borrowing facilities. In addition, it permits borrowers to challenge unfair debtor-creditor relationships in court.

Consumer Credit Act 1974

The 2006 Act brings two further types of agreement under the scope of the 1974 Act:
Consumer agreements above £25,000, to reflect growing levels of consumer borrowing and debt;
In section 1, to include small, one-man businesses and partnerships of up to three people.

Ombudsman scheme

The 2006 Act gives consumers the option of using the  Financial Ombudsman Service if they are unhappy with their lender's dispute resolution service, whether the lender consents or not.  Complaints may also be raised against other types of credit related companies, such as debt-collection agencies.

Office of Fair Trading
The 2006 Act empowers the Office of Fair Trading (OFT) to investigate applicants for consumer credit licences, to impose conditions on licences, and to impose civil penalties of up to £50,000 on companies, or £5,000 on individuals, failing to comply with its conditions.  Appeal is to the First-tier Tribunal (formerly the Consumer Credit Appeals Tribunal) and thence, with leave, to the Upper Tribunal.

Section 71 - Short title, commencement and extent
The following orders have been made under section 71(2):
The Consumer Credit Act 2006 (Commencement No. 1) Order 2006 (S.I. 2006/1508 (C. 52))
The Consumer Credit Act 2006 (Commencement No. 2 and Transitional Provisions and Savings) Order 2007 (S.I. 2007/123 (C. 6))
The Consumer Credit Act 2006 (Commencement No. 2 and Transitional Provisions and Savings) (Amendment) Order 2007 (S.I. 2007/387 (C. 14))
The Consumer Credit Act 2006 (Commencement No. 3) Order 2007 (S.I. 2007/3300 (C. 136))
The Consumer Credit Act 2006 (Commencement No. 4 and Transitional Provisions) Order 2008 (S.I. 2008/831 (C. 40))
The Consumer Credit Act 2006 (Commencement No. 4 and Transitional Provisions) (Amendment) Order 2008 (S.I. 2008/2444 (C. 105))

See also 
 Credit risk
 Trade Practices Act 1974 (Australia)
 Halsbury's Statutes

References

External links
Times Online article about the Act

UK Legislation 

Explanatory notes to the Consumer Credit Act 2006.

United Kingdom Acts of Parliament 2006